The Chimney Sweepers Act 1788 (28 Geo. 3 c. 48) was a British Act of Parliament passed to try to stop child labour. Many boys as young as four were being used as chimney sweeps.

This act stated that no boy should be bound apprentice before he was eight years old. His parents' consent must be obtained, the master sweep must promise to provide suitable clothing and living conditions, as well as an opportunity to attend church on Sundays. The clause inserted into the Bill  requiring Master Sweeps to be licensed was voted down in the House of Lords.

References
Notes

Bibliography

Great Britain Acts of Parliament 1788
United Kingdom labour law
Child labour law
Chimney sweeps